Leatherbark is an unincorporated community in Calhoun County, West Virginia, United States.  Its post office  is closed.

The community was named after a type of plant native to the area.

References 

Unincorporated communities in West Virginia
Unincorporated communities in Calhoun County, West Virginia